Darius B. Warner (February 26, 1832 – February 28, 1917) was a Union Army officer during the American Civil War.  

In 1863, as a lieutenant colonel, Warner led the 113th Ohio Infantry at the Battle of Chickamauga.  

On April 3, 1866, President Andrew Johnson nominated Warner for appointment to the grade of brevet brigadier general of volunteers, to rank from March 13, 1865, and the United States Senate confirmed the appointment on April 26, 1866.

He married Nancy Robinson in Lancaster, Pennsylvania, on June 7, 1856.  His Warner ancestors were from Anne Arundel County, Maryland, and Dublin, Ireland.

References

See also

List of American Civil War brevet generals (Union)

Union Army colonels
United States Army officers
1832 births
1917 deaths
People of Ohio in the American Civil War